Daniel T. Jones may refer to: 

 Daniel T. Jones (author), English author and researcher
 Daniel T. Jones (politician) (1800–1861), U.S. Representative from New York